Fabrizio De Chiara (14 November 1971 – 17 November 1996) was an Italian boxer. He competed in the men's light middleweight event at the 1992 Summer Olympics.

References

1971 births
1996 deaths
Italian male boxers
Olympic boxers of Italy
Boxers at the 1992 Summer Olympics
Boxers from Milan
Light-middleweight boxers